Vladimir Gutiérrez Rodríguez (born September 18, 1995) is a Cuban professional baseball pitcher for the Cincinnati Reds of Major League Baseball (MLB). He made his MLB debut in 2021.

Career
Gutiérrez played for the Cuba national baseball team at the 2014 Central American and Caribbean Games. He played in the Cuban National Series for the Vegueros de Pinar del Río and was the Rookie of the Year for the 2013-2014 season. Gutierrez was selected to represent his country in an international tournament but left his Pinar del Rio team during the Caribbean Series in February 2015 in San Juan, Puerto Rico. He made his way to Mexico, where he eventually established residency in May. Major League Baseball declared him to be a free agent on July 7, 2015.

On August 30, 2016, Gutiérrez signed with the Cincinnati Reds for $4.75 million. He made his professional debut in 2017 for the Daytona Tortugas and spent the whole season there, going 7–8 with a 4.46 ERA in 19 starts. He pitched for the Pensacola Blue Wahoos in 2018 and the Louisville Bats in 2019.

On June 28, 2020, Gutiérrez was suspended 80 games for testing positive for a performance-enhancing substance. On November 20, 2020, Gutiérrez was added to the 40-man roster. 

On April 25, 2021, Gutiérrez was activated off the restricted list and assigned to the alternate training site. On May 28, Gutiérrez was promoted to the major leagues for the first time to be the starting pitcher against the Chicago Cubs. In his debut, Gutiérrez took the loss after pitching 5.0 innings of 2-hit ball, one of the two hits being a solo home run from Cubs infielder David Bote. He also notched his first strikeout in the game, punching out Cubs catcher Willson Contreras. In his rookie campaign, Gutiérrez was 9–6 over 22 starts, posting a 4.74 ERA with 88 strikeouts in 114 innings.  Gutiérrez received a single vote in National League Rookie of the Year voting, tying him for eighth place with David Bednar.

In 2022, Gutiérrez made 10 appearances (8 starts) for the Reds, struggling to a 1-6 record and 7.61 ERA with 29 strikeouts in 36.2 innings of work. In June, Gutiérrez suffered a first degree strain of his ulnar collateral ligament, and underwent Tommy John surgery on July 22. The procedure subsequently ended his 2022 season.

References

External links

1995 births
Living people
Major League Baseball players from Cuba
Cuban expatriate baseball players in the United States
Defecting Cuban baseball players
Major League Baseball pitchers
Cincinnati Reds players
Vegueros de Pinar del Rio players
Daytona Tortugas players
Pensacola Blue Wahoos players
Louisville Bats players
Tigres del Licey players
Cuban expatriate baseball players in the Dominican Republic
People from Pinar del Río